RING1 and YY1-binding protein is a protein that in humans is encoded by the RYBP gene.

Interactions 

RYBP has been shown to interact with:

 Abl gene, 
  CBX2,
 Caspase 10, 
 E2F2, 
 E2F3, 
 Mdm2, 
 RING1,  and
 YY1.

References

Further reading